Kunzea muelleri, commonly known as yellow kunzea, is a flowering plant in the myrtle family, Myrtaceae and is endemic to mountainous areas of south-eastern Australia. It is a low-growing, spreading shrub with linear leaves and small groups of pale yellow, stalkless flowers that appear in the summer.

Description
The flowers are arranged in groups of mostly two or three near the ends of the branches.

Taxonomy and naming
Kunzea muelleri was first formally described in 1867 English botanist George Bentham  in his publication Flora Australiensis from a specimen collected by Victorian Government Botanist Ferdinand von Mueller. Mueller collected plants from the Haidinger Range, Mount Wellington and the Munyang Mountains and had given the species the name Kunzea ericifolia in 1855. This name was later deemed illegitimate as it has been previously assigned to another species. The specific epithet (muelleri) honours Mueller.

Distribution and habitat
This kunzea grows in alpine, subalpine and montane heath and is common in rocky areas.

References

muelleri
Flora of New South Wales
Flora of Victoria (Australia)
Myrtales of Australia
Taxa named by George Bentham
Plants described in 1867